Robert James Schroder (born December 30, 1944) is an American former professional baseball player. He appeared in 138 games, largely as a second baseman and shortstop, over four seasons (–) for the San Francisco Giants of Major League Baseball (MLB).

Schroder signed with the Giants in 1964 after attending Loyola University New Orleans. After a partial rookie pro season spent in the low minor leagues, Schroder was promoted to San Francisco's 40-man roster for 1965 and stayed with the MLB team all season.  Under the amended 1962 bonus rule, Major League clubs were compelled to keep players like Schroder on their 25-man roster for their first full season in baseball or risk losing them to another team. Schroder, 20, got into only 31 games and had only ten plate appearances for the contending 1965 Giants. He then split the 1966–1968 campaigns between San Francisco and the Triple-A Phoenix Giants.  In 1967, he played in 62 games for San Francisco and logged 135 at bats, his MLB career highs.  All told, he batted .217 during his time with the Giants; his 48 hits included five doubles and one triple.

Schroder pinch-hit for Juan Marichal after Marichal was ejected for hitting Los Angeles Dodgers catcher John Roseboro with a bat in the infamous Dodgers-Giants brawl on August 22, 1965.

References

External links

1944 births
Living people
Baseball players from New Jersey
Evansville Triplets players
Lexington Giants players
Magic Valley Cowboys players
Major League Baseball second basemen
Major League Baseball shortstops
People from Ridgefield, New Jersey
Phoenix Giants players
San Francisco Giants players
Sportspeople from Bergen County, New Jersey
Tacoma Cubs players